Álvaro "Mabi" de Almeida (12 October 1963 – 6 June 2010) was an Angolan professional football coach.

Career
De Almeida was appointed Manager of the Angolan national team in November 2008, having previously been the Assistant Coach. In April 2009, the Angola Football Federation announced that although Mabi de Almeida's position was safe, they would be looking for a new coach. However, just a few days later, Mabi de Almeida was sacked after seven months in charge. 
He was named manager of Angolan club side Caála in May 2010.

Death
De Almeida died on 6 June 2010 at the Huambo Province's Military Hospital, at the age of 46.

References

1963 births
2010 deaths
Angolan football managers
People from Benguela